Christian Schrader is an American sound engineer. He won four Primetime Emmy Awards and was nominated for eighteen more in the category Outstanding Sound Mixing.

References

External links 

Living people
Place of birth missing (living people)
Year of birth missing (living people)
American audio engineers
21st-century American engineers
Primetime Emmy Award winners